Hanna Ramadini (born 21 February 1995) is an Indonesian badminton player affiliated with Mutiara Cardinal Bandung club. She had been recently married with another badminton player, Arya Maulana Aldiartama.

Achievements

Southeast Asian Games 
Women's singles

BWF International Challenge/Series (2 titles, 2 runners-up) 
Women's singles

 BWF International Challenge tournament
 BWF International Series tournament

BWF Junior International (1 title, 1 runner-up) 
Girls' singles

  BWF Junior International Grand Prix tournament
  BWF Junior International Challenge tournament
  BWF Junior International Series tournament
  BWF Junior Future Series tournament

Participation at Indonesian team 
 1 time at Uber Cup (2016)
 1 time at Badminton Asia Team Championships (2016)
 1 time at SEA Games (2015)

Performance timeline

Indonesian team 
 Junior level

 Senior level

Individual competitions 
 Junior level

 Senior level

Record against selected opponents 
Head to head (H2H) against World Superseries finalists, World Championships semifinalists, and Olympic quarterfinalists:

  Sun Yu 0–3
  Saina Nehwal 0–3
  Akane Yamaguchi 0–2
  Nozomi Okuhara 0–3
  Sayaka Sato 1–1
  Yui Hashimoto 0–1
  Bae Yeon-ju 0–1
  Sung Ji-hyun 0–4
  Ratchanok Intanon 0–1
  Beiwen Zhang 0–2

References 

1995 births
Living people
People from Tasikmalaya
Sportspeople from West Java
Indonesian female badminton players
Badminton players at the 2014 Asian Games
Asian Games competitors for Indonesia
Competitors at the 2015 Southeast Asian Games
Competitors at the 2017 Southeast Asian Games
Southeast Asian Games silver medalists for Indonesia
Southeast Asian Games bronze medalists for Indonesia
Southeast Asian Games medalists in badminton